Fred Turner Martin (June 27, 1915 – June 11, 1979) was an American professional baseball pitcher, coach, manager and scout.

Career

Defected to Mexican League
Martin was one of a handful Major League Baseball players who "jumped" to the then-outlaw Mexican League during the  season. With the reserve clause binding players permanently to the U.S. teams in "Organized Baseball" who held their contracts, the insurgent Mexican League induced players such as Martin, Sal Maglie, Mickey Owen, Lou Klein, Max Lanier, Danny Gardella and others to leave their clubs — in Martin's (and Lanier's and Klein's) case, the pennant-contending but notoriously low-paying St. Louis Cardinals — for greater riches south of the border.

Martin, then almost 31, was in his first MLB campaign after seven years of toiling in the minors and four years of World War II service in the United States Army. He had appeared in six games for the 1946, title-bound Cards, winning two of three decisions and compiling an earned run average of 4.08 in 28 innings pitched. He, along with the other "jumpers," was then suspended from organized baseball by Commissioner of Baseball Albert B. Chandler. While the Mexican League raids of MLB stopped, and most of the American players soon attempted to rejoin Organized Baseball, the bans remained in force.

In 1949, Martin and Lanier filed a $2.5 million lawsuit against baseball in an attempt to have the five-year bans lifted. The case, "Martin et al. v. National League Baseball Club", was appealed to the U.S. Court of Appeals for the Second Circuit, and heard by its Chief Judge Learned Hand. As part of the lawsuit, Martin and Lanier had requested a preliminary injunction allowing the "jumpers" to immediately return to their former major league teams, per the reserve clause. A district judge had denied the injunction on the grounds that it would "disturb the status quo" by restoring the plaintiffs to positions which they had voluntarily resigned three years before. Also, the judge ruled that the players' rights depended upon disputed questions of fact and law, and that they had an adequate legal remedy in the recovery of damages. Hand and the appeals court affirmed the denial of the injunction but, with respect to the disputed questions of fact and law, added "that the cause should be preferred, and that it should be brought to trial as soon as possible."

On June 5, 1949, Chandler lifted the ban, and so Martin and Lanier dropped the suit.

Reinstatement to U.S. pro baseball
He then spent one final season in the National League with the  Cards, winning four of six decisions and posting a 5.12 earned run average. Overall, Martin appeared in 57 career MLB games, won 12 games and lost only three, with an earned run average of 3.78 in 162 innings pitched. Martin pitched in the minor leagues through the 1950s; his last pitching appearance came as the 45-year-old playing manager of the Class C St. Cloud Rox. Martin appeared in 618 minor league games between 1935 and 1960, and won 169 of 304 decisions.

Taught 'split-finger fastball'
In addition, he would have a long post-playing career as a scout, minor league manager and pitching coach, largely in the Chicago Cubs organization. He was a member of the Cubs' College of Coaches from 1961 to 1965 and served as a minor league instructor for the Cubs (1966–1975; 1977–1978) and Detroit Tigers (1976). He became especially famous as a proponent of the split-finger fastball, which he taught to Cub farmhand Bruce Sutter, who mastered it, became a dominant relief pitcher in the 1970s and 1980s, and was elected to the Baseball Hall of Fame in 2006.

Sutter's success focused industry-wide attention on Martin's expertise. In 1979, former Cub shortstop Don Kessinger, named the playing manager of the Chicago White Sox, asked him to be his pitching coach, but Martin was ill with cancer.  He began treatments in March, and served only a few weeks in the job. He died June 11, 1979, in Chicago, at the age of 63.

References

External links

 Coach's page from Retrosheet
 Bruce Sutter's Hall of Fame induction speech

1915 births
1979 deaths
American expatriate baseball players in Mexico
Austin Senators players
Baseball coaches from Oklahoma
Baseball players from Oklahoma
Chicago Cubs coaches
Chicago Cubs scouts
Chicago White Sox coaches
Columbus Red Birds players
Dallas Rangers players
Deaths from cancer in Illinois
Diablos Rojos del México players
Duluth Dukes players
Houston Buffaloes managers
Houston Buffaloes players
Houston Buffs players
Major League Baseball pitchers
Major League Baseball pitching coaches
Mexican League baseball pitchers
Portsmouth Red Birds players
Rochester Red Wings players
St. Cloud Rox players
St. Louis Cardinals players
Sherbrooke Athletics players
Shreveport Sports players
Siloam Springs Travelers players
Temple Eagles players
Union City Greyhounds players
United States Army personnel of World War II